AHA International School (formerly American Hebrew Academy until 2020) was intended to be an international college-preparatory school located in Greensboro, North Carolina. It was to be open to students of all faiths but was originally founded as a Jewish international school, American Hebrew Academy, the only such school in the world for boarding and day students between 9th and 12th grade. The coeducational school's  campus was designed by Aaron Green, protégé of renowned architect Frank Lloyd Wright. The school closed in June 2019 but later announced plans to reopen for the 2021–2022 school year.

History 
AHA International School opened in 2001 as the American Hebrew Academy, known as "AHA". The school was founded by several leaders in Jewish education, including Alvin Mars, to create a pluralistic learning and leadership environment. The initial objective of the school was simply to create a high school option for the local Jewish community near Greensboro, and to draw a critical mass of students from other regions of the country where Jewish day school was not a feasible option. Subsequent to the school's founding, the school's unique identity as a coed, pluralistic Jewish boarding school attracted students globally and hosted a diverse student body from over 35 countries.

The academy's inception was sponsored and spearheaded by Maurice "Chico" Sabbah, a philanthropist, businessman, Sephardic Jew, and Zionist, and longtime resident of Greensboro. Sabbah's nephew, Glenn Drew, continued to manage the school and served as CEO executive director, and General Counsel since the school's beginning. Drew resigned in November 2020.

Board members included Leeor Sabbah, Glenn Drew, Joseph Weilgus, Joel Fleishman of Duke University, investor Michael Steinhardt, Jehuda Reinharz of Brandeis University, Marsha Cohen, Bonnie Lipton, Scott Shay of Signature Bank, Douglas Greene, Abe Tawil and Larry Heyman.

Closing and rebranding 
On June 11, 2019, Glenn Drew notified community members that the school would close after 18 years, citing financial distress. The news was broadly reported as abrupt and unexpected. On September 13, 2019 the academy announced plans to reopen in for the 2020-2021 school year.

In May 2020, the academy announced plans to rebrand itself for reopening in 2021, after receiving a $26 million investment from a Chinese education company Puxin Limited. As part of its rebranding, the school would encourage international enrollment, including countries in the Middle East and Asia.

The academy was renamed AHA International School and was scheduled to reopen in September 2021. As part of its reopening, the school's college prep program was expanded to place a higher emphasis on Advanced Placement courses and professional experience opportunities for students.

AHA International School also released a video announcing that campus tours would resume in September 2020, and students would be admitted for classes beginning in August 2021. Abe Tawil served as head of school. Due to the global COVID-19 pandemic, the school did not reopen.

The Department of Health and Human Services announced a $50 million dollar 5 year lease of the campus to use as a transitional housing facility for unaccompanied migrant children.

Academics 
Operating on a semester calendar with a three-week winter term, AHA International School intended to embrace three progressions toward graduation based on student interests and goals, each with its own set of required courses and varying degrees of flexibility for students to personalize their path. All students were to engage in career-oriented internships and professional experiences. The Winter Term would provide three weeks of immersive study around a specific theme during January, allowing for experiential learning or educational travel. Both the dual enrollment and early college programs would allow qualified students to earn early college credits along with Advanced Placement (AP) credits.

The primary language of instruction was to be English, with proficiency in another language required. Currently Spanish, French, and Mandarin languages are available for study on campus. Due to the large population of students from abroad, AHA International School would have an English for Speakers of Other Languages program to prepare international students for successful completion of upper level (including AP) high school courses and transition to the American university system.

Many AHA faculty members (24%) were also international or from a dual-language background. More than half of faculty hold at least a master’s degree, with one-third holding doctorates or the equivalent. Among the alumni are 29 National Merit Scholarship Award honorees.

Campus 
AHA International School is situated on a  campus, including a  lake. Following a national architectural competition to design the campus, Frank Lloyd Wright’s associate architect, Aaron Green, was commissioned to create the master plan for the campus and building designs for every building the academy would eventually need for the immediate future and for years to come.

In addition to 16 single-sex dormitory houses and 34 staff resident apartments, the academy had 32 buildings including an 88,000 square feet (8,200 m2), $18 million athletic center and natatorium. The athletic center includes two basketball courts, rock climbing walls, a racquetball court, an exercise gym and an eight-lane pool.

As of 2016, American Hebrew Academy had the largest closed-loop geothermal exchange well field in the United States to heat and cool its campus. In 2016, the academy dedicated the new Charlotte K. Frank Center for Plant Science & Ecology which provides a state of the art research and experimentation facility for advancing the study of hydroponics, aquaculture, soil and water conservation and Israel's leadership in the development of agricultural technology.

All AHA students were issued laptops. Classrooms have SMART Boards, projectors and cameras and microphones. Classroom seating was at a Harkness style table, teardrop-shaped that facilitates the socratic method. The maximum class-size for most classes was 12 students, allowing for one-on-one interaction with peers and instructors.

Athletics 
In addition to the 88,000 square foot athletic center and natatorium, the academy has playing fields including: a soccer stadium, baseball fields, softball fields, multiple all-purpose fields, and a rubberized track constructed of recycled materials. As a member of the Triad Athletic Conference, AHA International School offers baseball, basketball, cross-country, soccer, swimming, track and field, and volleyball. The academy also hosts a number of intramural and club sports including racquetball, tennis, softball, golf, touch football, ultimate Frisbee, yoga, aerobic and weight training, kayaking and sailing, karate, and rock climbing.

From 2010 until 2019, the grounds of AHA were host to URJ 6 Points Sports Academy, a sports Jewish summer camp. Open to young athletes ages 9 to 17 from all over North America and abroad, 6 Points Sports is a sleep-away camping experience that offers intensive training in the individual's chosen sport as well as cross-conditioning electives.

The academy also served as the host site for the Piedmont Triad Regional Special Olympics for over ten years beginning in 2006.

Student life 
International students represent a meaningful proportion of AHA International School student body. Forty-five percent of the students came from 35 countries. The top five countries represented as of September 2017 were the United States, Mexico, Israel, Brazil and Canada. American students came from 26 states across the U.S.

AHA students interested in specializing in a particular area such as STEM, pre-med, law, business, technology, and the arts were able to enhance their studies through a formal partnership with The University of North Carolina at Greensboro and the North Carolina Joint School of Nanoscience and Nanoengineering as well as early university studies in all offered subject areas at Guilford College.

References

External links 

 Official website

Boarding schools in North Carolina
Educational institutions established in 2001
Private high schools in North Carolina
Preparatory schools in North Carolina
Pluralistic Jewish day schools
Jewish day schools in the United States
Jews and Judaism in North Carolina
Schools in Greensboro, North Carolina
2001 establishments in North Carolina